Jon David Andrews (born 26 April 1967) is a New Zealand cycling coach and former Olympic cyclist. He won two bronze medals at the 1990 Commonwealth Games. He competed at the 1992 Summer Olympics.

Andrews was awarded the New Zealand 1990 Commemoration Medal. He is the father of cyclist Ellesse Andrews.

References

External links
 

1967 births
Living people
New Zealand male cyclists
Olympic cyclists of New Zealand
Cyclists at the 1992 Summer Olympics
Cyclists at the 1990 Commonwealth Games
Cyclists from Christchurch
Commonwealth Games medallists in cycling
Commonwealth Games bronze medallists for New Zealand
20th-century New Zealand people
21st-century New Zealand people
Medallists at the 1990 Commonwealth Games